Mentira may refer to:

Film and TV
La Mentira, a 1970 film starring Julissa and Enrique Lizalde
La mentira (1965 TV series), a Mexican telenovela set in Brazil for Telesistema Mexicano
La mentira (1998 TV series) or Twisted Lies, a Mexican telenovela for Televisa
Una mentira, a 1967 Mexican telenovela

Music
Mentiras, el musical, Mexican musical produced by OCESA
"Mentira" (song), 1982 song by Hernaldo Zúñig, later covered by Buddy Richard, Valeria Lynch, and others
"Mentira", song by La Ley from MTV Unplugged, 2001
"Mentira", song by Manu Chao from Clandestino, 1998
"Mentiras", song by Daniela Romo from Daniela Romo, 1983
"Mentiras", song by Los Amigos Invisibles from Commercial, 2009
"Mentiras", song by Lupita D'Alessio, 1987
"Mentiras", song by Remmy Valenzuela, 2019
"Mentiras", song by Selena from Selena, 1989
"Mentiras", song by Brazilian band Zero from Quinto Elemento'', 2007

Mentira

El significado de esta palabra es de las mentiras que te hecho tu ex pero caistes en todas y cada una de ellas.

-Fernanda Gonzalez Lagos <3 

Pd: date cuenta man.